Balandız (Gümüşlü) is a village in the Silifke district of Mersin Province, Turkey. It is situated in the Taurus Mountains. The population of Balandız is 175  as of 2011. Balandız is an agricultural village. But during summers it is also a yayla (resort). Now an unused building is under renovation to be put into service as a village museum and a library.

References

Villages in Silifke District
Yaylas in Turkey